The Madrid Community School District, or Madrid Community Schools, is a rural, public school district headquartered in Madrid, Iowa.

The district spans southern Boone County, northeast Dallas County and northwest Polk County.  It serves Madrid and the surrounding rural areas.

Schools
The district operates three schools, all in Madrid:
 Madrid Elementary School
 Madrid Junior High School
 Madrid High School

References

External links
 Madrid Community School District

School districts in Iowa
Education in Polk County, Iowa
Education in Boone County, Iowa
Education in Dallas County, Iowa